In 2015, the Australian radio station ABC Classic FM held the thirteenth of its annual Classic Music countdowns, during which the public votes for 100 favourite pieces. The chosen theme was "Swoon", which refers to a fainting and in this context is used to mean "little parcel of [musical] rapture" or music "that makes [the listeners'] world stand still." The Classic 100 Swoon countdown was broadcast in reverse order from 5 to 8 June.

Countdown results 
The results of the countdown are as follows:

By composer 
The following composers were featured in the countdown:

Note: Bach had 10 entries on the countdown, including Jesu, Joy of Man's Desiring as part of Herz und Mund und Tat und Leben and as a separate entry.

See also 
 Classic 100 Countdowns
 List of classical music composers by era

References 

Classic 100 Countdowns (ABC)
2015 in Australian music
2015 in radio